Wang Xiaojie (born 19 November 1971) is a former synchronized swimmer from China.

References 

1971 births
Living people
Chinese synchronized swimmers
Olympic synchronized swimmers of China
Synchronized swimmers at the 1992 Summer Olympics
Sportspeople from Changsha
Synchronized swimmers from Hunan
Synchronized swimmers at the 1991 World Aquatics Championships